The Rivervale Inverted Siphons, also known as the Rivervale Tunnel, are a historic flood control project in rural Poinsett County, Arkansas.  It is essentially a very large concrete culvert, which channels the water flow of Ditch Number 4 under the Right Hand Chute Little River, into which it would normally drain.  It is located just off Arkansas Highway 135 in northeastern Poinsett County, near its junctions with County Roads 87 and 112. Built in 1924–26, the purpose of the culvert was to reduce the amount of water carried by the Right Hand Chute during major flooding events by diverting the volume of Ditch Number 4 further downstream.  As part of a robust series of flood control works, it helped stabilize flood management in the area so that further economic development could take place.

The structure was listed on the National Register of Historic Places in 1991.

See also
National Register of Historic Places listings in Poinsett County, Arkansas

References

Industrial buildings and structures on the National Register of Historic Places in Arkansas
Buildings and structures completed in 1926
Buildings and structures in Poinsett County, Arkansas
Flood control projects
National Register of Historic Places in Poinsett County, Arkansas